Silver iodate (AgIO3) is a light-sensitive, white crystal composed of silver, iodine and oxygen. Unlike most metal iodates, it is practically insoluble in water.

Production
Silver iodate can be obtained by reacting silver nitrate (AgNO3) with sodium iodate or potassium iodate. The by-product of the reaction is sodium nitrate.

Alternatively, it can be created by the action of iodine in a solution of silver oxide.

Uses
Silver iodate is used to detect traces of chlorides in blood.

References

Iodates
Silver compounds
Oxidizing agents